This is a list of schools of the Roman Catholic Archdiocese of Dubuque.

High schools

Former high schools

Elementary schools
Schools active as of April 7, 2020:
 St. Cecilia School - Ames
 St. Patrick School - Anamosa - It opened in 1944.
 Marquette Catholic School System (Bellevue Area Consolidated School) - Bellevue
 CFS Catholic School (Calmar-Festina-Spillville Consolidation) - St. Aloysius Center in Calmar and St. Wenceslaus Center in Spillville - In 2019 CFS and St. Theresa of Calcutta announced plans to consolidate into a single school, with the Calmar campus closing. Beginning fall 2020 the Ossian campus will house grades K-2 and middle school while the Spillville campus will house grades 3-4.
 Aquin Elementary School - Cascade
 St. Patrick School - Cedar Falls - A significant renovation occurred beginning in May 2014.
 All Saints School (Xavier Catholic Schools) - Cedar Rapids
 Holy Family School System (Xavier Catholic Schools) - Formerly Holy Family Consolidated School - Cedar Rapids
 St. Matthew School - Cedar Rapids
 St. Pius X School - Cedar Rapids
 Regis Middle School - Cedar Rapids
 Immaculate Conception School - Charles City
 Notre Dame Elementary School - Cresco
 St. Benedict School - Decorah - It opened in 1885 in a two story, four room frame building. The school, with five nuns as teachers, was initially until high school but in 1919 became an elementary-middle school only. The convent, which had a second-floor bridge to the original school building, was renovated to be the second school building. In 1964 the current school was built for $268,000 in southern Decorah. A new addition was established in the 1980s, with a music room, a storage and teaching aid area, and two classrooms. - 
 Holy Family Catholic Schools - Dubuque - Formed in 2001 as an administrative consolidation of various area Catholic schools.
 Nativity School - Dubuque
 Resurrection School - Dubuque
 St. Anthony School - Dubuque
 St. Columbkille School - Dubuque
 St. Francis Xavier School - Dyersville
 Bosco System - Possibly: Gilbertville-Raymond Consolidation (Immaculate Conception Center in Gilbertville and (formerly?) St. Joseph Center in Raymond)
 St. Mary School a.k.a. Guttenberg-North Buena Vista Consolidation (St. Mary School) - Guttenberg
 LaSalle Catholic - Holy Cross -- Possibly new version of RCHL Catholic School (Holy Cross Center in Holy Cross and Holy Trinity Center in Luxemburg)
 St. John School - Independence
 St. Athanasius School - Jesup
 St. Mary School - Manchester
 St. Francis Catholic School, formerly Marshalltown Area Catholic School - Marshalltown
 Newman Catholic System - Mason City
 Sacred Heart School - Maquoketa
 St. Joseph School - Marion
 Sacred Heart School - Monticello
 St. Joseph Community School - New Hampton - On August 15, 1904 the school building and convent, which had a cost of $15,000, were dedicated. A fire destroyed the building in November 1921; the cause was never uncovered. Construction on a new school began in spring 1922, with the cornerstone laid on May 1. C. O. Emery Construction company made the $56,731.67 two story brick structure, which included a multipurpose room that housed a stage, auditorium, and/or gymnasium.
 Sacred Heart School - Oelwein - The school was established in 1904 in its own building. By 2019 it sustained a decline in income and in the number of students and established a GoFundMe to stave off closure.  it has about 165 students.
 St. Teresa of Calcutta (formerly? St. Francis de Sales School) - Ossian - In 2019 CFS and St. Theresa of Calcutta announced plans to consolidate into a single school, with the Calmar campus closing. Beginning fall 2020 the Ossian campus will house grades K-2 and middle school while the Spillville campus will house grades 3-4.
 Seton Catholic School - Peosta -- Possibly new version of: Seton Catholic Elementary Consolidation (St. Patrick Center in Epworth, St. Joseph Center in Farley, and St. John Center in Peosta)
 Trinity Catholic School - Protivin
 Cedar Valley Catholic Schools - Waterloo - Could be a consolidation of:
 Blessed Sacrament School - Waterloo - The school occupied the first floor of a joint church-school building which had the cornerstone laid on September 17, 1950. In 1951 12 classrooms were added, and in 1961 additional space was built. Capacity increased accordingly to more than 300 and then 570, respectively. The convent was connected to the main building by the second addition.
 Sacred Heart School - Waterloo - In August 1909 the school opened, and in 1931 it received a convent, gymasium, and another expansion.
 St. Edward School - Waterloo
 St. Thomas Aquinas School - Webster City
 St. Patrick School - Waukon

Former schools
List from year 2000:
 Sherrill-Balltown Consolidation (St. Francis Center in Balltown and S. Peter and Paul Center in Sherrill)
 Former Holy Family campuses - Dubuque
 Holy Trinity-Sacred Heart Consolidation - Dubuque, merged into St. Francis School in 2002.
 Downtown Catholic School (St. Mary-St. Patrick Consolidation) - Dubuque - Established in 1982, merged into St. Francis School in 2002.
 St. Francis School - Formed in 2002, closed in 2004.
 In 2019 the school system considered whether to close Holy Ghost School, which had 75 students, and/or St. Anthony School, which had 79 students. The decision was to close both effective 2020.
 Sacred Heart School - Dubuque
 St. Joseph the Worker School - Dubuque
 Archbishop Hennessy Catholic School - New Vienna and Petersburg - Formed in 1987 as part of a consolidation, which had two locations: grades K-3 in New Vienna, and preschool and 4-6 in Petersburg. It served as the joint parish school for Saint Boniface Church in New Vienna and Saints Peter and Paul Church in Petersburg. Enrollment was over 100 at that time. In 2013 the school consolidated all grades into its Petersburg location. Enrollments consistently decreased prior to 2017: by 2017 the school only had 45 students. Archbishop Hennessy closed in 2018.
 Saint Boniface School - New Vienna - The parish school of Saint Boniface Church, it started operations in 1847. It consolidated into Archbishop Hennessy in New Vienna in 1987.
 St. Joseph School - Earlville
 St. John-St. Nicholas Consolidation (St. Nicholas Center in Evansdale and St. John Center in Waterloo) - It formed in 1975 with the merger of two schools. They merged into Queen of Peace School in 2003.
 St. Joseph Consolidated School - Key West
 Immaculate Conception School - North Buena Vista - It was in operation until it merged into St. Mary's Catholic School in Guttenberg in 1968.
 Sacred Heart School - Osage - It opened in 1957. By 2012 it had 44 students due to consistent decreases in the student count. The school closed in 2012.
 St. Luke's School - St. Lucas
 Visitation School - Stacyville - The school, originally serving grades K-12, occupied a main building that opened in 1923 and a gymnasium. In 1968 the high school closed, making it a K-8 school. The school closed in 2003. The main building became the site of the Stacyville Memories Museum while the Stacyville Community Center and the Kids Care Daycare Center occupied the gymnasium. In 2012 it was announced the main building was to be demolished, with the museum going to the Stacyville Library, though the gymnasium would remain.
 Queen of Peace School - Waterloo - A part of Cedar Valley Catholic Schools since 2003, it formed in 2001 by the merger of St. Mary School and St. John-St. Nicholas School. It closed in 2005.
 St. Joseph School - Waterloo - In 1872 a school building, initially for K-12, was established. The high school ended in 1959 as Columbus High School opened. The church closed in 2002.
 St. Mary School - Waterloo - Merged into Queen of Peace School in 2001.
 St. Paul School - Worthington - It started circa 1874. In 2015 it had 26 students, and closed that year.

References

Schools
Dubuque
Dubuque